Tunnel Junction railway station co-served the village of Coundon Grange, in the historic county of County Palatine of Durham, England, from 1858 to 1863 on the Shildon branch of the Stockton and Darlington Railway.

History
The station was opened on 13 October 1858 by the North Eastern Railway. It appeared in the handbook of stations as Tunnel Branch Junction. It was a short-lived station, only being open for under 5 years before closing on 1 August 1863.

References

Disused railway stations in County Durham
Former North Eastern Railway (UK) stations
Railway stations in Great Britain opened in 1858
Railway stations in Great Britain closed in 1863
1858 establishments in England
1863 disestablishments in England